Euclarkia is a genus of long-jointed beetles in the family Tenebrionidae. There is one described species in Euclarkia, E. costata, found in Australia.

References

Silvanidae genera
Monotypic Cucujiformia genera